Soul In The Hole is a 1997 documentary film about aspiring basketball coach Kenny Jones, his playground dream team "Kenny's Kings," the relationship between him and his players (particularly playground phenom 18-year-old Ed "Booger" Smith) and life in Brooklyn during the summer.

It won the Independent Spirit: Truer Than Fiction Award (tied with Errol Morris' "Fast, Cheap and Out of Control") and was nominated for an International Documentary Association Award (IDA). Named Top Ten Gem by Premiere Magazine; twice-named Top Ten Film and called "...The best film made about basketball--and about growing up black, male and street..." by the Village Voice . Selected in competition or otherwise screened at the Rotterdam, Berlin, Munich, Cologne, Helsinki, Festival des Femmes, New Zealand and other international film festivals.

Box office
Soul in the Hole was given a theatrical release on August 8, 1997. The film grossed $30,697 while being shown in 6 theaters. Internationally, it was theatrically and television released in France, Germany and the UK and many other countries by Celluloid Dreams.

Soundtrack

A soundtrack containing hip hop music was released on July 29, 1997 by Loud Records, with the theme song by The WuAllStars. It peaked at 73 on the Billboard 200 and 13 on the Top R&B/Hip-Hop Albums.

References

External links
 

1997 films
Documentary films about basketball
1997 documentary films
American sports documentary films
1990s English-language films
1990s American films